The 1945 Oregon Webfoots football team represented the University of Oregon as a member of the Pacific Coast Conference (PCC) during the 1945 college football season. In their fifth season under head coach Tex Oliver, the Webfoots compiled a 3–6 record, finished in fourth place in the PCC, and were outscored 124 to 116. The season marked the resumption of play after the conclusion of World War II; Oregon last fielded a team in 1942 and Oliver last coached them in 1941.

Three home games were played on campus at Hayward Field in Eugene and one at Multnomah Stadium in Portland.

Schedule

References

External links
 Game program: Oregon at Washington State – November 10, 1945
 Game video – Oregon at Washington State – November 10, 1945

Oregon
Oregon Ducks football seasons
Oregon Webfoots football